Antônio Carlos de Sousa Pereira (born 22 June 1948 in Campos dos Goytacazes, Rio de Janeiro), better known as Tonico Pereira, is a Brazilian television and film actor.

Filmography

The rules of the game (2015-2016) .... Ascâncio
Rio, I Love You (2014) .... Fernando
O Palhaço (2011)
Assalto ao Banco Central (2011) .... Doutor
Saneamento Básico (2007) .... Seu Antônio
Brasília 18% (2006) .... Emílio de Menezes
O coronel e o lobisomem (2005) .... Seu Padilha
O veneno da madrugada (2004) .... Barbeiro
Redentor (2004) .... Delegado
Quase dois irmãos (2004) .... Head of Prison
Um show de verão (2004) .... Seu Cisco
Maria, mãe do filho de Deus (2003) .... Herodes
Clandestinidade (2003)
Querido estranho (2002) .... Manoel
Caramuru - A Invenção do Brasil (2001) .... Itaparica
Copacabana (2001) .... Raimundo
A hora marcada (2000) .... Beltrano
No coração dos deuses (1999) .... Cirineu
Traição (1998) .... Jordão
O primeiro dia (1998) .... Carcereiro
Policarpo Quaresma, herói do Brasil (1998) .... Bustamante
Como ser solteiro (1998)
Guerra de Canudos (1997) .... coronel Moreira César
O cego que gritava luz (1997) .... Dimas/Pedro
O guarani (1996) .... Aires
Erotique (1994) .... (segment "Final Call")
Era uma vez... (1994) .... Rei Turíbio
Menino Maluquinho (1994) .... Motorista
A Grande Arte (1991) .... Rafael, the Henchman
Vai trabalhar, vagabundo II - a volta (1991) .... Palhaço
O quinto macaco (1990) .... Second Man
Círculo de fogo (1990)
Corpo em delito (1990)
Fábula de la Bella Palomera (1988)
Dedé Mamata (1988) .... Jacques
Running Out of Luck (1987) .... Truck Driver
Ele, o boto (1987)
Romance da empregada (1987)
O homem da capa preta (1986) .... Bereco
O rei do Rio (1985)
Nunca fomos tão felizes (1984) .... Policial
Memórias do cárcere (1984) .... Desidério
O coronel e o lobisomem (1979)
A república dos assassinos (1979)
A Lira do Delírio (1978)
Crueldade mortal (1976) .... Nozinho
A queda (1976)
As aventuras amorosas de um padeiro (1975)

TV work
 2007 Amazônia, de Gálvez a Chico Mendes - Genivaldo
 2002 Desejos de Mulher - Kléber
 2001 Porto dos Milagres - Francisco Vieira (Chico)
 1999 Andando nas Nuvens - Torquato
 1997 Por Amor - Oscar (Paizinho)
 1997 O Amor Está no Ar - Chicão
 1995 Engraçadinha, seus amores e seus pecados - Xavier (minissérie)
 1993 Fera Ferida - Chico Tirana
 1992 De Corpo e Alma - Vado
 1989 O Sexo dos Anjos - Aranha
 1988 Bebê a Bordo - Válter (cameo)
 1987 O Outro - Nininho Americano
 1986 Anos Dourados - Ronaldo
 1977 Sítio do Picapau Amarelo - Zé Carneiro

References

External links

1948 births
Brazilian male actors
Living people
People from Campos dos Goytacazes